
The Food Safety Authority of Ireland (FSAI) ( – USBE) is the statutory body responsible for ensuring food produced, distributed or marketed in Ireland complies with food safety and hygiene standards, best practice codes and legal requirements.

The FSAI was established on 1 January 1999, with the enactment of the Food Safety Authority of Ireland Act, 1998. The chief executive of the FSAI is Dr. Pamela Byrne.
The FSAI Act empowers the Authority to issue closure orders and prohibition orders on food businesses which do not comply with food safety and hygiene requirements.

2013 horse meat scandal
The FSAI conducted tests on a sample of frozen beefburgers sold in Irish and British supermarkets in early 2013, and announced on 15 January that the test results had revealed significant quantities of horse meat in several of the products tested. The findings triggered the 2013 meat adulteration scandal, which involved several major food retailers and suppliers in the United Kingdom, France and other European countries.

References

External links
Food Safety Authority of Ireland website

safefood

Government agencies of the Republic of Ireland
Government agencies established in 1999
1999 establishments in Ireland
Food safety organizations
Medical and health organisations based in the Republic of Ireland
Regulation in Ireland